Camille Chautemps (1 February 1885 – 1 July 1963) was a French Radical politician of the Third Republic, three times President of the Council of Ministers (Prime Minister).

He was the father-in-law of U.S. politician and statesman Howard J. Samuels.

Early life
Born into a family of Radical politicians, Camille Chautemps was a lawyer by training and a noted amateur rugby-player in his youth, playing for Tours Rugby and Stade Français. He was inducted into the Grand Orient of France (1906, master 1908), quitting the Freemasons in August 1940 as anti-masonic regulation is adopted by Pétain.

Early career
He entered local politics in the fiefdom of his parliamentarian uncle, Alphonse Chautemps, and followed a political career path typical of many Radical-Socialists:  first elected town councillor for Tours (1912), then mayor (1919–25), parliamentary deputy (1919–34) and senator (1934–40). Chautemps was considered one of the chief figures of the 'right' (anti-socialist and pro-liberal) wing of the centre-left Radical-Socialist Party. Between 1924 and 1926, he served in the centre-left coalition governments of Édouard Herriot, Paul Painlevé and Aristide Briand.

Twice prime minister
Renowned as a skilful negotiator with friends from across the party divide, he was called upon on several occasions to attempt to build support for a coalition of the centre-left. He first became President of the Council for a short-lived government in 1930. After the electoral victory of the left in 1934, he served as Interior Minister and became head of government once more in November 1933. The revelations of the Stavisky Affair, a corruption scandal, tarnished two of his ministers, sparking violent protests by the far-right leagues. He resigned his posts on 27 January 1934, when the opposition press attributed Stavisky's suicide to a government cover-up.

Deputy Prime minister and last premiership
In Léon Blum's Popular Front government of 1936, Chautemps represented the Radical-Socialist Party as a Minister of State and succeeded Blum at the head of the government from June 1937 to March 1938. The franc was devalued, but government finances remained in difficulty. Pursuing the program of the Popular Front, he proceeded in the nationalisation of the railroads to create the SNCF. However, in January 1938, he formed a new government consisting solely of ministers from the nonsocialist republican centre- left. In February, he granted married women financial and legal independence (until then, wives had been dependent on their husbands to take action involving family finances) and allowed them to go to university and to open bank accounts. His government also repealed Article 213 of the code: "the husband owes protection to his wife, the wife obedience to the husband". However, the husband remained "head of the household" with "the right to choose the household’s place of residence". His government fell on 10 March.

Runup to World War II
Chautemps subsequently served from April 1938 to May 1940 as deputy prime minister in the governments of Édouard Daladier and Paul Reynaud. After the latter resigned, as he was again deputy prime minister, now to Marshal Philippe Pétain.

World War II
France declared war on Germany in September 1939, and in May 1940, the German Army invaded and swept aside all opposition. With the fall of Dunkirk on 5 June and the defeat of the French Army imminent, Chautemps, dined with Paul Baudouin on the 8th, and declared that the war must be ended and that Pétain saw his position most clearly. On the 11th, during a Cabinet meeting, Chautemps suggested for Churchill to be invited back to France to discuss the hopeless situation; he attended a conference at Tours on 13 June. The Cabinet met again on the 15th and was almost evenly split on the question of an armistice with Germany. Chautemps now suggested that to break the deadlock, that they should get a neutral authority to enquire what the German terms would be, which if honourable, the Cabinet could agree to study. If not, the Cabinet would agree to fight on. The Chautemps proposal passed by 13 to 6.

On 16 June, Charles de Gaulle, now in London, telephoned Reynaud to give him the British government's offer of joint nationality for French and British in a Franco-British union. A delighted Reynaud put it to a stormy Cabinet meeting and was supported by five of his ministers. Most of the others were persuaded against him by the arguments of Pétain, Chautemps and Jean Ybarnégaray, the last two seeing the offer as a device to make France subservient to Britain as an extra dominion. Georges Mandel, who had a Jewish background, was flinging accusations of cowardice around the room, and Chautemps and others replied in kind. Reynaud clearly would not accept Chautemps's proposal and later resigned.

Later life
Chautemps broke with Pétain's government after he had arrived in the United States on an official mission and lived there for much of the rest of his life. After World War II, a French court convicted him in absentia for collaborating with the enemy; he was amnestied in 1954.

After his death in Washington, DC, he was laid to rest in the Rock Creek Cemetery.

Chautemps's First Ministry, 21 February – 2 March 1930
Camille Chautemps (Radical) – President of the Council and Minister of the Interior
Aristide Briand (PRS) – Minister of Foreign Affairs
René Besnard (Radical) – Minister of War
Charles Dumont (AD) – Minister of Finance
Maurice Palmade (Radical) – Minister of Budget
Louis Loucheur (RI) – Minister of Labour, Hygiene, Welfare Work, and Social Security Provisions
Théodore Steeg (Radical) – Minister of Justice
Albert Sarraut (Radical) – Minister of Marine
Charles Daniélou (RI) – Minister of Merchant Marine
Laurent Eynac (RI) – Minister of Air
Jean Durand (Radical) – Minister of Public Instruction and Fine Arts
Claudius Gallet – Minister of Pensions
Henri Queuille (Radical) – Minister of Agriculture
Lucien Lamoureux (Radical) – Minister of Colonies
Édouard Daladier (Radical) – Minister of Public Works
Julien Durand (Radical) – Minister of Posts, Telegraphs, and Telephones
Georges Bonnet (Radical) – Minister of Commerce and Industry

Chautemps's Second Ministry, 26 November 1933 – 30 January 1934
Camille Chautemps – President of the Council and Minister of the Interior – Radical Socialist Party
Joseph Paul-Boncour – Minister of Foreign Affairs
Édouard Daladier – Minister of War
Georges Bonnet – Minister of Finance
Paul Marchandeau – Minister of Budget
Lucien Lamoureux – Minister of Labour and Social Security Provisions
Eugène Raynaldy – Minister of Justice
Albert Sarraut – Minister of Marine
Eugène Frot – Minister of Merchant Marine
Pierre Cot – Minister of Air
Anatole de Monzie – Minister of National Education
Hippolyte Ducos – Minister of Pensions
Henri Queuille – Minister of Agriculture
Albert Dalimier – Minister of Colonies
Joseph Paganon – Minister of Public Works
Alexandre Israël – Minister of Public Health
Jean Mistler – Minister of Posts, Telegraphs, and Telephones
Laurent Eynac – Minister of Commerce and Industry

Changes
9 January 1934 – Lucien Lamoureux succeeds Dalimier as Minister of Colonies.  Eugène Frot succeeds Lamoureux as Minister of Labour and Social Security Provisions.  William Bertrand succeeds Frot as Minister of Merchant Marine.

Chautemps's Third Ministry, 22 June 1937 – 18 January 1938
Camille Chautemps – President of the Council – Radical Socialist Party
Léon Blum – Vice President of the Council – French Section of the Workers' International (SFIO)
Yvon Delbos – Minister of Foreign Affairs – Radical Socialist Party
Édouard Daladier – Minister of National Defense and War – Radical Socialist Party
Marx Dormoy – Minister of the Interior – SFIO
Georges Bonnet – Minister of Finance – Radical Socialist Party
André Février – Minister of Labour – SFIO
Vincent Auriol – Minister of Justice – SFIO
César Campinchi – Minister of Marine – Radical Socialist Party
Pierre Cot – Minister of Air – Radical Socialist Party
Jean Zay – Minister of National Education – Radical Socialist Party
Albert Rivière – Minister of Pensions – SFIO
Georges Monnet – Minister of Agriculture – Radical Socialist Party
Marius Moutet – Minister of Colonies – SFIO
Henri Queuille – Minister of Public Works – Radical Socialist Party
Marc Rucart – Minister of Public Health – Radical Socialist Party
Jean-Baptiste Lebas – Minister of Posts, Telegraphs, and Telephones – SFIO
Fernand Chapsal – Minister of Commerce
Paul Faure – Minister of State – SFIO
Maurice Viollette – Minister of State – usr
Albert Sarraut – Minister of State – Radical Socialist Party
Léo Lagrange – Under-Secretary of State for the Sports, the Leisure activities and the Physical Education -i.e. acting like Minister for the Sports- – SFIO

Chautemps's Fourth Ministry, 18 January – 13 March 1938
Camille Chautemps – President of the Council – Radical Socialist Party
Édouard Daladier – Vice President of the Council and Minister of National Defense and War
Yvon Delbos – Minister of Foreign Affairs
Albert Sarraut – Minister of the Interior
Paul Marchandeau – Minister of Finance
Paul Ramadier – Minister of Labour
César Campinchi – Minister of Justice
William Bertrand – Minister of Military Marine
Paul Elbel – Minister of Merchant Marine
Guy La Chambre – Minister of Air
Jean Zay – Minister of National Education
Robert Lassalle – Minister of Pensions
Fernand Chapsal – Minister of Agriculture
Théodore Steeg – Minister of Colonies
Henri Queuille – Minister of Public Works
Marc Rucart – Minister of Public Health
Fernand Gentin – Minister of Posts, Telegraphs, and Telephones
Pierre Cot – Minister of Commerce
Georges Bonnet – Minister of State
Ludovic-Oscar Frossard – Minister of State in charge of the Services of the Presidency of the Council

References

External links
 Camille Chautemps papers, 20 feet housed at Stanford University Libraries
 

1885 births
1963 deaths
Politicians from Paris
Radical Party (France) politicians
Prime Ministers of France
Transport ministers of France
French interior ministers
Government ministers of France
Members of the 12th Chamber of Deputies of the French Third Republic
Members of the 13th Chamber of Deputies of the French Third Republic
Members of the 14th Chamber of Deputies of the French Third Republic
Members of the 15th Chamber of Deputies of the French Third Republic
French Senators of the Third Republic
Senators of Loir-et-Cher
Mayors of places in Centre-Val de Loire
French Freemasons